Timothy Alexander Chow, also known as Chou Tingyang (born 18 January 1994) is a professional footballer who currently plays for Chengdu Rongcheng in the Chinese Super League. Born in England, he has represented Chinese Taipei at international level.

He has previously played for Wigan Athletic and Ross County.

Club career

Wigan Athletic
Born in Wigan, Greater Manchester to a father of Chinese descent and an English mother, Chow started his career with his hometown club Wigan Athletic, joining the club at the age of nine after being spotted by a Wigan scout whilst playing for Blackbrook JFC. He progressed through the youth system at the club and signed his first professional contract in 2012, signing a two-year deal.

On 12 August 2014 he was called up for a matchday squad for the first time, remaining an unused substitute as Wigan lost 1–2 away to League Two club Burton Albion in the first round of the League Cup at the Pirelli Stadium. His next call-up was on 3 January 2015 in the third round of the FA Cup away to rivals Bolton Wanderers at the Macron Stadium, again remaining unused as they lost 0–1.

He made his debut for the club on his first league call-up on 14 April 2015, appearing as a substitute for Jermaine Pennant for the last nine minutes of a Championship game away to Millwall, a 0–2 defeat at The New Den. Four days later, he made his first start on his first appearance at the DW Stadium, against Brighton & Hove Albion. In the 26th minute, he scored his first professional goal, opening a 2–1 win by heading in Pennant's cross.

Earlier in April, Chow had been told by Wigan manager Malky Mackay that he would be released at the end of the season. However, new manager Gary Caldwell gave him a new contract. Chow reflected to BBC Radio Manchester that "I had a few other options and I was basically looking at a new club for the summer, but it's a funny old game, isn't it?"

Ross County
On 25 August 2016, Chow signed for Scottish Premiership club Ross County on a two-year contract. He made his debut for the Dingwall-based team two days later, replacing Christopher Routis in the 59th minute of a 1–0 loss at Hamilton Academical. On 15 October, he was sent off after 21 minutes of a 4–0 loss at Aberdeen for a foul on Jonny Hayes. He scored his first goal for the club in a 6–2 win against Dundee United in the Scottish Cup on 21 January 2017.

Spartak Subotica
In summer 2018, Chow was on trials at Serbian side FK Spartak Subotica. After successful trials, he asked to delay his signing because of the possibility to sign with Spanish La Liga side Deportivo Alavés. When Spartak Subotica passed to the third round of the 2018–19 UEFA Europa League after beating AC Sparta Prague and Alavés move was still unclear, Chow decided to sign with Spartak becoming, by early August, their latest reinforcement along Ukrainian youth international Serhiy Kulynych.

Henan Jianye
In 2019, Tim Chow completed his first season for Chinese club Henan Jianye, scoring 2 goals.

Chengdu Rongcheng
On 25 April 2022, Tim Chow joined Chinese Super League club Chengdu Rongcheng.

International career
After obtaining the Republic of China passport on 30 October 2017, he was called up to the national squad for the 14 November 2017 game against Turkmenistan. Though he started the game, but could not prevent a 2–1 loss which saw Chinese Taipei fail to qualify for the 2019 AFC Asian Cup.

Personal life
Chow is of three quarters English ancestry, and one quarter Chinese ancestry from his grandfather who was from Ningbo, Zhejiang, and moved to Taiwan after World War II before moving again to the United Kingdom. It was proved that Chow has Taiwanese nationality after he went to Ningbo to look for his grandfather's birth certificate. Chow has stated that he would be interested in representing Chinese Taipei at international level, which he later did.

Career statistics

References

External links
 
 

1994 births
Living people
Footballers from Wigan
People with acquired Taiwanese citizenship
Taiwanese footballers
Chinese Taipei international footballers
English footballers
Wigan Athletic F.C. players
English Football League players
Ross County F.C. players
FK Spartak Subotica players
Serbian SuperLiga players
Henan Songshan Longmen F.C. players
Chengdu Rongcheng F.C. players
Chinese Super League players
Expatriate footballers in Serbia
Association football midfielders
Scottish Professional Football League players
British Asian footballers
English people of Taiwanese descent
Taiwanese people of English descent
Taiwanese expatriate footballers